D band may refer to:
 D (band), a Japanese visual kei rock band
 D band (NATO), a radio frequency band from 1 to 2 GHz
 D band (waveguide), a millimetre wave band from 110 to 170 GHz